The Spread Eagle, on the corner of Albert Street and Parkway, is a Grade II listed pub in Camden Town in the London Borough of Camden, London, England.

References

External links
Official website

Grade II listed buildings in the London Borough of Camden
Pubs in the London Borough of Camden
Camden Town